Ureterp is a village in the municipality of Opsterland in the east of Friesland, the Netherlands. After Gorredijk it is the second largest village of the municipality with a population of around 4,785 in January 2017.

History 

The village was first mentioned in 1315 as Urathorp, and means "higher settlement". Ura (higher) has been added to distinguish from Olterterp. Ureterp developed in the late middle ages on a sandy ridge. In the 17th century, a second settlement developed at the sluice of the Drachtster Compagnonsvaart. The tower and the north face of Dutch Reformed church are from the 13th century. The church was extensively modified around 1800.

Ureterp was home to 1,512 people in 1840.

Notable people 
 Lieuwe de Boer (born 1951), ice speed skater
 Saco Rienk de Boer (1883–1974), landscape architect and city planner
  (born 1966), long track speed skater
 Alyda Norbruis (born 1989), Paralympic cyclist
 Jelle Wagenaar (born 1989), footballer

Gallery

References

External links

Populated places in Friesland
Geography of Opsterland